Stanstead Journal was an English Weekly newspaper founded in 1845 by LeRoy Robinson in Stanstead, Quebec. It was the oldest weekly newspaper in Quebec. It ceased publication May 29, 2019.

See also
List of newspapers in Canada

References

Weekly newspapers published in Quebec
Publications established in 1845
1845 establishments in Quebec
English-language newspapers published in North America